Chor Lau-heung is a Hong Kong wuxia television series adapted from the first three novels in the Chu Liuxiang novel series by Taiwanese writer Gu Long. Adam Cheng starred as the titular protagonist, Chor Lau-heung (Cantonese for "Chu Liuxiang"). The series was first broadcast on TVB on September 3, 1979. The 65 episodes long series was divided into four parts: The Legend of Mo-fa (無花傳奇), The Great Desert (大沙漠), Legend of the Divine Palace (神宮傳奇) and The Final Battle (最後一戰).

Cast
 Note: Some of the characters' names are in Cantonese romanisation.

 Adam Cheng as Chor Lau-heung
 Angie Chiu as So Yung-yung
 Liza Wang as Shum Wai-san
 Mary Hon as Shum Wai-lam
 Ng Man-tat as Wu Tit-fa
 Ching Hor-wai as Ko Ah-nam
 Ha Yu as Kei Bing-ngan
 Kwan Chung as Mo-fa
 Wong Wan-choi as Nam-kung Ling
 Wong Shee-tong as Chung-yuen Yat-dim-hung
 Liu On-lai as Sung Tim-yee
 Ko Miu-see as Lei Hung-sau
 Susanna Au-yeung as Black Pearl
 Lui Yau-wai as Yam Kei
 Idy Chan as Yeung Ngan
 Wong Hang-sau as Nam-kung Yin
 Cheng Lai-fong as Yam Sin
 Law Lan as So Sam-tse
 Leung San as Shek Koon-yam
 Louise Lee as Lau Mo-mei
 So Hang-syun as Kuk Mo-yung
 Sharon Yeung as Fung Fei-yin
 Chan Man-yi as Cheung-suen Hung
 Sheung-koon Yuk as Ko Tai-kwan
 Kwan Hoi-san as Ko Koon-ying
 Bak Man-biu as Ko Koon-chung
 Ho Pik-kin as Ko Koon-yung
 Cheung Ying-choi as King of Lou-lan
 Amy Wu as Queen of Lou-lan
 Sam-sam as Princess Pipa
 Chan Hung-lit as Ting Tit-kon
 Kam Hing-yin as Lang Chau-wan
 Chong Man-ching as Ting Ching-ching
 Shih Kien as Lei Koon-yu
 Cheung Chung as Lei Yuk-ham
 Kwok Fung as Shek Tor
 Kam Kwok-wai as Siu-poon
 Cheung Sang as Yam-chi
 Law Kwok-wai as Wu On-ping
 Cheung Tim-yau as Tai Tuk-hang
 Lok Kung as Master Tin-fung
 Chan Yau-hau as General Man
 Tsui Kwong-lam as Bluebeard
 Ho Lai-nam as Mount Yam Ghost Marshal
 Kong Ngai as White Jade Demonic Beggar
 Lee Kwok-lun as Pak-ming
 Tam Chuen-hing as Tin-fung Sap-say-long
 Ho Kwai-lam as Yu Wu-fa
 Chu Kong as Sung Kong
 Natalis Chan as Fei-ying
 Cho Jai as Left Guardian
 Chung Chi-keung as Right Guardian
 Chow Kat as Si Tsat-long
 Leung Hung-wah as Suen Hok-po
 King Doi-yum as Ying-ying
 Leung Oi as Abbess Ching-yam
 Kent Tong
 Liu Kai-chi
 Barbara Chan
 Wong Man-yee
 Chan Yuk-lun
 Mak Tsi-wan
 Wong Jo-see
 Leung Pik-ling
 Yu Muk-lin
 Chan On-ying

Controversy with RTV's It Takes a Thief
In 1979 around the time TVB released Chor Lau-heung, another Hong Kong television station RTV produced a similar television series titled It Takes a Thief. TVB and RTV became involved in copyright lawsuits against each other because of similarities between Chor Lau-heung and It Takes a Thief. TVB won the lawsuits and eventually RTV had to change the Chinese title of It Takes a Thief from 盜帥留香 to 俠盜風流, and the names of characters in the television series. It Takes a Thief started airing on 1 September 1979, two days earlier than TVB's Chor Lau-heung.

Reception

The series received good reviews from viewers in Taiwan after the first two episodes were first aired on CTV as part of the Golden Bell Awards screenings. Following that, CTV acquired rights from Hong Kong's TVB to broadcast the entire series in Taiwan, starting on April 18, 1982, under a Mandarin voice dub.

Music album
Chor Lau-heung (楚留香) is an album by Hong Kong actor and singer Adam Cheng, released by Crown Records in 1979. It contains the main theme song "Chor Lau-heung" and the insert song "Lau-heung's regret" (留香恨) from the television series. RTHK selected the main theme song as one of the Top Ten Gold Songs of 1979. In this album, lyricist Cheng Kwok-kong (鄭國江) is credited as Kong Yu (江羽).

References

External links
 

1979 Hong Kong television series debuts
1979 Hong Kong television series endings
1982 Hong Kong television series debuts
1982 Hong Kong television series endings
TVB dramas
Hong Kong wuxia television series
Works based on Chu Liuxiang (novel series)
Cantonese-language television shows
Television shows based on works by Gu Long